Zanele Vimbela (born 28 April 1989) is a South African netball player. She has featured for the South Africa national netball team on several occasions, most notably in the 2014 Commonwealth Games and 2018 Commonwealth Games, as well as the 2019 Netball World Cup.

References

1989 births
Living people
Commonwealth Games competitors for South Africa
Netball players at the 2014 Commonwealth Games
Netball players at the 2018 Commonwealth Games
Sportspeople from Johannesburg
South African netball players
Netball Superleague players
Team Bath netball players
Sirens Netball players
2019 Netball World Cup players
South African expatriate netball people in England
South African expatriate sportspeople in Scotland